The Northern 25 is a Canadian sailboat that was originally designed by Philip Rhodes and adapted by Dennis Fernice as a cruiser and first built in 1970.

Production
The design was built by Northern Yachts in Ajax, Ontario, Canada between 1970 and 1989, with about 250 examples completed.

Development
The Northern 25 is a development of the O'Day Outlaw 26. Northern Yachts bought the molds from O'Day Corp. and Dennis Fernice made changes to the design, including adding a fin keel and a taller cabin, to give  of headroom below decks, but at the expense of cockpit forward visibility.

Design
The Northern 25 is a recreational keelboat, built predominantly of fibreglass, with wood trim and anodized spars. It has a  masthead sloop rig, a spooned raked stem, a reverse transom, a skeg-mounted rudder controlled by a tiller and a fixed fin keel. It displaces  and carries  of ballast.

Originally designed for an outboard motor, early trials indicated that the lazarette would flood when under way, due to the engine location. Only two boats were delivered without inboard engines and production models were generally fitted with Vire  inboard gasoline engine.

The design originally incorporated boom roller reefing, but many were later modified to eliminate this feature, due to sail wear.

The design has a PHRF racing average handicap of 222 with a high of 216 and low of 234.

Operational history
In a 1999 review in Canadian Yachting, Pat Sturgeon praises the interior layout and space, writing, "From the dock it appeared to be a typical classic looking boat with a high coach house and long cockpit, but when l went below, the volume and clever layout of the interior astounded me. Most boats in this size range offering large interior space tend to look like a barn rather than a boat, but the Northern 25 was different. All the space a family of cruisers could hope for was tucked into just 25 feet and wrapped in an eye pleasing exterior."

In a review Michael McGoldrick wrote, "It's not a bad looking boat, but its appearance is dated by it[s] spoon bow. One minor annoyance with this boat is that people seated in the cockpit will have difficulty seeing over the cabin top because it arches up over the centerline to give an impressive 6' 2" of headroom down below."

See also
List of sailing boat types

Similar sailboats
Beachcomber 25
Bayfield 25
Bombardier 7.6
Cal 25
Cal 2-25
C&C 25
Capri 25
Catalina 25
Catalina 250
Com-Pac 25
Dufour 1800
Freedom 25
Hunter 25.5
Jouët 760
Kelt 7.6
Kirby 25
MacGregor 25
Merit 25
Mirage 25
O'Day 25
Redline 25
Sirius 26
Tanzer 25
US Yachts US 25
Watkins 25

References

External links

Keelboats
1970s sailboat type designs
Sailing yachts
Sailboat type designs by Philip Rhodes
Sailboat types built by Northern Yachts